Felipe Nieves (born 15 September 1969) is a Puerto Rican boxer. He competed in the men's bantamweight event at the 1988 Summer Olympics.

References

External links
 

1969 births
Living people
Puerto Rican male boxers
Olympic boxers of Puerto Rico
Boxers at the 1988 Summer Olympics
Sportspeople from Bayamón, Puerto Rico
Bantamweight boxers